Ministry for Atomic Energy of the Russian Federation and Federal Agency on Atomic Energy (or Rosatom), were a Russian federal executive body in 1992–2008 (as Federal Ministry in 1992–2004 and as Federal Agency in 2004–2008).

The Ministry for Atomic Energy of the Russian Federation, or MinAtom, was established on January 29, 1992 as a successor of the Ministry of Nuclear Engineering and Industry of the USSR.

On March 9, 2004, it was reorganized as the Federal Agency on Atomic Energy.

According to the law adopted by the Russian parliament in November 2007, and signed by the President Putin in early December, the agency was transformed to a Russian state corporation (non-profit organisation), the Rosatom Nuclear Energy State Corporation.

Heads 
 Viktor Mikhaylov (1992-1998)
 Yevgeny Adamov (1998-2001)
 Alexander Rumyantsev (minister) (2001-2005)
 Sergey Kiriyenko (2005-2007)

See also 

 Ministry of Medium Machine Building of the USSR, Soviet ministry in charge of civil nuclear activities in the USSR
 Nuclear power in Russia
 Institute for Theoretical and Experimental Physics
 Institute for High Energy Physics
 Atomenergoprom, civil nuclear activities including Tekhsnabexport (fuel/uranium exporter), Energoatom
 Energy policy of Russia

References

External links 
 Official website of the Federal Agency for Atomic Energy

Nuclear energy in Russia
Nuclear technology in Russia

1992 establishments in Russia
2004 establishments in Russia
Defunct government agencies of Russia